Stardust Galaxies is the fourth studio album produced by Johannesburg-based South African rock band the Parlotones. The album has been certified Gold, having sold 20,000 copies in its first week of release. The album was released on 30 October 2009, during the Parlotones' 2009 world tour.

"We Call This Dancing", "Brighter Side of Hell" and 'Welcome to the Weekend' were featured in the American reality TV show, Jersey Shore, during various episodes of Season 3.

Track listing

References

External links 
The Parlotones announce new album
Review of Stardust Galaxies
The Parlotones discuss success until present
Parlotones’ latest album Stardust Galaxies goes gold

The Parlotones albums
2009 albums